Cox's Criminal Cases are a series of law reports of cases decided from 1843 to 26 June 1941.

They were published in 31 volumes from 1846 to 1948. They were then incorporated in the Times Law Reports.

For the purpose of citation, their name may be abbreviated to "Cox CC", "CCC" or "Cox".

References

External links
Cox's Criminal Cases. Cardiff Index to Legal Abbreviations. Cardiff University.
Cox's Criminal Cases, vol 1 (1843 to 1846) , vol 2 (1846 to 1848), vol 3 (1848 to 1850) , vol 4 (1850 to 1851) , vol 5 (1851 to 1852), vol 6 (1852 to 1855) , vol 7 (1855 to 1858) , vol 8 (1858 to 1861) , vol 9 (1861 to 1864), vol 10 (1864 to 1867) from Google Books.

Case law reporters of the United Kingdom